Dreams is an American sitcom that aired on CBS from October 3 to December 19, 1984. It follows the story of a fictional rock band that tries to get a recording contract.

Cast
 John Stamos as Gino Minnelli (guitar)
 Jami Gertz as Martha Spino (vocals)
 Cain Devore as Phil Taylor (bass)
 Albert Macklin as Morris Weiner (drums)
 Valerie Stevenson as Lisa Copley (vocals/piano)
 Sandy Freeman as Louise Franconi
 Ron Karabatsos as Frank Franconi

Episodes

Soundtrack

External links 
 

1984 American television series debuts
1984 American television series endings
1980s American musical comedy television series
1980s American sitcoms
CBS original programming
Television shows set in Philadelphia
Television series created by Andy Borowitz